Paul Allen (1953–2018) was an American businessman and co-founder of Microsoft.

Paul Allen may also refer to:

People

Paul Allen (editor) (1775–1826), American editor and author
Paul Hastings Allen (1883–1952), American composer
Paul H. Allen (1911–1963), American botanist
Paul M. Allen (born 1951), American cellular immunologist
Paul Allen (footballer) (born 1962), English footballer
Paul Coy Allen (born 1977), American filmmaker, television director and music video director
Paul Allen (bassist), bass player for Hal
Paul Allen (sports commentator) (born 1966), host of The Paul Allen Show on KFXN-FM and radio broadcaster for the Minnesota Vikings
Paul Allen, co-founder of Ancestry.com

Characters

Paul Allen, a character in the 1991 novel and 2000 film American Psycho that was killed by the main character Patrick Bateman

See also

Paul Allen Simmons (1921–2014), American federal judge
Allen (surname)
Allen Paul (disambiguation)
Allen (disambiguation)
Paul (disambiguation)